The Heritage Corridor (HC) is a Metra commuter rail line in Chicago, Illinois, and its southwestern suburbs, terminating in Joliet, Illinois. While Metra does not refer to its lines by colors, the Heritage Corridor appears on Metra timetables as "Alton Maroon," after the  Alton Railroad, which ran trains on this route. The name Heritage Corridor refers to the Illinois and Michigan Canal Heritage Corridor. Established in 1984, it runs parallel to the line.

Unlike other Metra lines, the Heritage Corridor runs during weekday rush hours only in the peak direction–to Chicago in the morning and Joliet in the afternoon. The Heritage Corridor takes less than 1 hour to reach Joliet, significantly faster than the Rock Island District which also serves Joliet.

As of December 12, 2022, Metra operates six trains (three in each direction) on the Heritage Corridor on weekdays, with each train serving all stations on the route. There is currently no off-peak, weekend, or holiday service on the Heritage Corridor.

Metra offered "Rails, Trails, and Ales" excursion service on Saturdays in the fall of 2021 and the summer of 2022. In 2021, two trains in each direction made all stops between Union Station and Joliet from September 18 to October 16. In 2022, three trains in each direction made all stops between Union Station and Joliet from July 2 to September 3.

The Heritage Corridor has the lowest train frequency and fewest number of stations of any other Metra line.

Like the North Central Service and the SouthWest Service, all stations on the route are fully ADA-accessible.

Route 
The line runs from Union Station in downtown Chicago through southwestern suburbs to Joliet. In March 2016, the public timetable shows four Chicago to Joliet trains each weekday. An additional train runs inbound during the afternoon rush hour but as an empty equipment move or deadhead. 

Amtrak's Texas Eagle and Lincoln Service use these tracks from Union Station to Joliet, as do Canadian National freight trains, with CN being the owner of the tracks on which the corridor runs. The Texas Eagle only stops at Chicago and Joliet, while the Lincoln Service also stops at Summit. The Joliet Transportation Center replaced Joliet Union Station on April 11, 2018.

On May 16, 2017, Metra announced that the new station for Romeoville had officially broken ground near the intersection of 135th St and New Avenue. The cost of the new station is estimated to be around $4.9 million. The station was opened to the public on February 5, 2018.

Metra has included the possibility of extending the Heritage Corridor in their Cost Benefit Analysis report. If this were to happen, the Heritage Corridor would continue south from Joliet to Wilmington, with an additional station in Elwood.

Stations

Ridership
Between 2014 and 2019 annual ridership has remained steady at roughly 730,000. Due to the COVID-19 pandemic, ridership dropped to 177,838 passengers in 2020 and to 82,197 passengers in 2021.

Notes

References

External links 

 Heritage Corridor service schedule

Alton Railroad
Metra lines
1984 establishments in Illinois